Cladogynos is a genus of shrubs in the family Euphorbiaceae, first described as a genus in 1841. It contains only one known species, Cladogynos orientalis, native to Southeast Asia (Thailand, Vietnam, Cambodia, Malaysia, Indonesia, Philippines) and southern China (Guangxi Province).

References

Epiprineae
Monotypic Euphorbiaceae genera
Flora of Asia